Frederick A. Masoudi (b. 1965, Denver, Colorado, United States) is an American cardiologist with expertise in cardiovascular outcomes research, clinical registries and quality measurement.

Career
He is a practicing cardiologist, Associate Professor of Medicine at University of Colorado, Denver  and a senior member of the Colorado Cardiovascular Outcomes Research Consortium. Masoudi has served as the Chair of the American College of Cardiology (ACC)/American Heart Association (AHA) Task Force on Performance Measures (2007–2010); is the Vice-Chair of the AHA Quality of Care and Outcomes Council; and is an Associate Editor of the journal Circulation

Selected publications
Masoudi FA, Havranek EP, Wolfe P, Rathore SS, Gross CP, Steiner JF, Ordin DL, Krumholz HM.  Most hospitalized older persons do not meet the enrollment criteria of clinical trials in heart failure.  Am Heart J 2003;146:250-257. 
Masoudi FA, Wang Y, Inzucchi SI, Havranek EP, Setaro JF, Krumholz HF.  Metformin and thiazolidinedione use in Medicare patients with heart failure.  JAMA 2003;290:81-85. 
Masoudi FA, Rathore SS, Wang Y, Havranek EP, Curtis JP, Foody JM, Krumholz HM. National patterns of use and effectiveness of angiotensin converting enzyme inhibitors in older patients hospitalized with heart failure and left ventricular systolic dysfunction. Circulation 2004;110:724-731. 
Masoudi FA, Gross CP, Wang Y, Rathore SS, Havranek EP, Foody JM, Krumholz HM. Adoption of spironolactone therapy for older patients with heart failure and left ventricular systolic dysfunction: insights from the National Heart Care Project. Circulation 2005;112:39-47. 
Masoudi FA, Baillie CA, Wang Y, Bradford WD, Steiner JF, Havranek EP, Foody JM, Krumholz HM. The complexity and cost of drug regimens of older patients hospitalized with heart failure in the United States, 1998-2001. Arch Intern Med 2005;165:2069-2076. 
Matlock DD, Peterson PN, Heidenreich PA, Lucas FL, Malenka DJ, Wang Y, Curtis JP, Kutner JS, Fisher ES, Masoudi FA. Regional Variation in the Use of Implantable Cardioverter-Defibrillators for Primary Prevention: Results From the National Cardiovascular Data Registry. Circ Cardiovasc Qual Outcomes 2010. 
Peterson PN, Shetterly SM, Clarke CL, Bekelman DB, Chan PS, Allen LA, Matlock DD, Magid DJ, Masoudi FA. Health literacy and outcomes among patients with heart failure. JAMA. 2011 Apr 27;305(16):1695-701. .

References

American cardiologists
Living people
1965 births
University of Colorado Denver faculty
Johns Hopkins University alumni